Leslie Allan Bryant (29 June 1896 – 24 April 1965) was an Australian rules footballer who played with Fitzroy in the Victorian Football League (VFL).

Football
A follower, Bryant started his career at West Adelaide. Bryant joined Norwood in 1920 and was a member of Norwood's 1922 premiership team. He was already 26 by the time he made his VFL debut. 

At Fitzroy, he played a total of 35 senior games, 16 in 1923 and 19 the following year. Bryant appeared in six finals, including the 1923 VFL Grand Final loss to Essendon, which he played from a forward pocket. He represented Victoria in an interstate match against South Australia in 1923.

In 1925, Bryant was cleared to the Benalla Football Club in the Ovens & Murray Football League.

Notes

References

External links

1896 births
1965 deaths
Australian rules footballers from South Australia
Australian Rules footballers: place kick exponents
Fitzroy Football Club players
West Adelaide Football Club players
Norwood Football Club players
Australian military personnel of World War I